Yeliseyevichi is a rural locality (a village) in Zhiryatinsky District, Bryansk Oblast, Russia. The population was 24 as of 2010. There are 2 streets.

Geography 
Yeliseyevichi is located 14 km southwest of Zhiryatino (the district's administrative centre) by road. Goritsy is the nearest rural locality.

References 

Rural localities in Zhiryatinsky District